My Aunt, Your Aunt is a 1956 West German comedy crime film directed by Carl Boese and starring Theo Lingen, Hans Moser and Georg Thomalla. Boese had previously made a 1939 film of the same title. It was shot in Agfacolor at the Bavaria Studios in Munich. The film's sets were designed by the art directors Hertha Hareiter and Otto Pischinger.

Cast
 Theo Lingen as Theo Müller
 Hans Moser as Hans Gippner
 Georg Thomalla as Tommy Schneider
 Oskar Sima as Oscar Starwasser
 Fritz Imhoff as Anthropologist
 Harry Fuß as Harry Schröder
 Ethel Reschke as Lola, cabaret artiste
 Gerty Godden as Lotte
 Sabine Bethmann as Helga
 Rolf Olsen as Anthropologist
 Ernst Braaso
 Hans Hansen
 Paul Heidemann as Bankdirektor Kretschmer
 Helga Martin as Frieda
 Hans Hermann Schaufuß as Der alte Berger

References

Bibliography 
 Hans-Michael Bock and Tim Bergfelder. The Concise Cinegraph: An Encyclopedia of German Cinema. Berghahn Books, 2009.

External links 
 

1956 films
1950s crime comedy films
German crime comedy films
West German films
1950s German-language films
Films directed by Carl Boese
Gloria Film films
1956 comedy films
1950s German films
Films shot at Bavaria Studios